Naseem Thebo (April 1, 1948 – March 19, 2012) was an educationist and writer of Sindhi language. She served as an Associate Professor in the Department of Economics, University of Sindh, Pakistan. She was a teacher, a short story writer, and a contributor to Sindhi literature. She was wife of Sindhi politician Rasool Bux Palijo.

Early life and education 
Naseem Thebo was born on 1 April 1940 in Shikarpur and got  early education from Ghari (Sindhi: ڳاڙهي), a village in Dadu district and did MA in Economics from University of Sindh Jamshoro. Her father's name was Mir Abdul Baqui Thebo. Her mother Badam Natawan was the first Sindhi Pakistani female Novelist. Her sister Benazir Thebo was also a writer. Her brother Mir Thebo was a political activist and communist leader.

Contributions as a writer 
She inherited the art of writing from her mother Badam Natawan. She wrote her first Sindhi short story ” Ghoran Ji Rekha” (Sindhi: ڳوڙهن جي ريکا ) meaning “line of teardrops” when she was studying in tenth standard. Titles of some of her other stories are “Ghayal The Ghariyan” (Sindhi: گهايل ٿي گهاريان) meaning “living being injured”, “Wadhay Jin Widhiyas” (Sindhi: وڍي جن وڌياس) "Those who wounded", “Mon Jherenday chhadia” (Sindhi: مون جهيڙيندي ڇڏيا) meaning “I left them fighting ” this story was written on the subject of separation of East Pakistan from west Pakistan,” Ubhur Chand Pas Piren” (Sindhi: اڀر چنڊ پس پرين) "O Moon rise and behold my beloved”, “Rasando Bharjando Ghaav” (Sindhi: رسندو ڀرجندو گهاءُ) meaning “Lacerating Healing Wound” , “Ahsas Ja Chak” (Sindhi: احساس جا چڪ) etc. Most of the titles of her short stories are taken from the verses of great Sindhi Sufi Poet Shah Abdul Latif Bhittai. All these stories were published in different popular journals of Sindhi literature of that time, such as “Sojhro”, “Barsat”, ” Halchal” , ” Mehran” etc. She wrote around 25 stories. Many of her stories are written in the backdrop of village life, she had chance to witness up-close. The misery of women folk, plight of farmer's at the hands of landlords and thanna culture, were some of the glimpses of ugly side of village life that found place in her stories.

Her story collections titled Ubhur Chand Pas Piren (in Sindhi) was published by Sindhi Adabi Board in 2013. In this book, her 15 stories have been compiled by Din Muhammad Kalhoro.

Personal life 
Naseem Thebo was married to politician Rasool Bux Palijo. She had two daughters Tania Palijo (also known as Tania Saleem) and Anita Aijaz. She was Mother in Law of columnist Aijaz Mangi.

Death 
She died on 19 March 2012 in Karachi.

References

 Writers from Sindh
1948 births
2012 deaths
 Sindhi-language writers
 Sindhi people
 Pakistani writers
 Pakistani female writers
 Sindhi female writers
 Pakistani feminist writers